Taypi Qullu (Aymara taypi center, middle, qullu mountain, "center mountain", Hispanicized spelling Taypi Kkollu) is a mountain in the Cordillera Occidental in the Andes of Bolivia, about  high. It is located in the Oruro Department, Sabaya Province, Sabaya Municipality, Parajaya Canton, near the border with Chile. Taypi Qullu lies south-east of the mountain Lliscaya and south-west of the mountains Laram Pukara and Kimsa Chata.

References 

Mountains of Oruro Department